Sir Peter Hannay Bailey Tapsell (1 February 1930 – 18 August 2018) was a British Conservative Party politician and Member of Parliament (MP) for Louth and Horncastle. He served in the House of Commons continuously from 1966 until 2015, and was also previously an MP from 1959 to 1964. He was Father of the House between 2010 and 2015.

Early life and education 
Tapsell was born in Hove, Sussex. He was educated at Tonbridge School, served in the Royal Sussex Regiment from 1948 to 1950, and continued his education at Merton College, Oxford, gaining a BA in Modern History in 1954, during which time he was also elected Librarian of the Oxford Union (a senior office). Tapsell was a member of the Oxford University Labour Club and the Oxford Union debating society during his time at Merton.

Political career
Tapsell worked as a personal assistant to Sir Anthony Eden during the 1955 general election. He contested the Wednesbury by-election in 1957, losing to the Labour Party candidate John Stonehouse. Tapsell was chairman of the Coningsby Club (a dining club for Conservative graduates, restricted at that time to graduates of Oxford and Cambridge) from 1957 until 1958.

He first entered Parliament in the 1959 general election, representing Nottingham West. After losing his seat at the 1964 general election, he was selected for Horncastle, representing the constituency from 1966 to 1983. In 1983, boundary changes moved Tapsell to East Lindsey, which he represented until 1997 when further boundary changes moved him to Louth and Horncastle. Tapsell was knighted in 1985. Tapsell was a long-time supporter of Keynesian economics, and opposed the monetarist policies of Margaret Thatcher's governments.  In 1981, he voted against Sir Geoffrey Howe's Budget – becoming, as Peter Oborne noted, "the first Conservative since Harold Macmillan in the 1930s to vote against a Budget, a brave move which turned him into an internal political exile."

Tapsell was known for his forthright views and was sometimes controversial. In May 2001, he made headlines during the UK general election campaign when comparing German Chancellor Gerhard Schröder's vision of Europe to Adolf Hitler's: "We may not have studied Hitler's Mein Kampf in time but, by heaven, there is no excuse for us not studying the Schröder plan now". Tapsell was opposed to the wars in Iraq and Afghanistan, and called for Tony Blair to be impeached for misleading parliament over the invasion of Iraq. From 2005 onwards he was the only MP from any party who had been first elected in the 1950s, but the two-year gap in his parliamentary service prevented him from becoming Father of the House until Alan Williams retired in 2010. He is one of the few MPs in parliamentary history to have served over fifty years in the House of Commons.

Tapsell was strongly Eurosceptic. He was in favour of Britain leaving the EU. He also felt that of all his political actions the thing of which he was most proud was his opposition to the Maastricht Treaty, "because everything that has gone wrong in Britain dates from us joining the European Union. One of the reasons the House of Commons has lost its prestige is because people feel we are no longer in charge of a country. So much of the legislation that affects them is imposed by Brussels."

In November 2005, he was the only Conservative MP, and one of only two non-Labour MPs, to vote in favour of a proposal to allow police to detain terror suspects for up to 90 days without charge. During the 2006 Lebanon War, he said that Israeli action in Lebanon was "gravely reminiscent of the Nazi atrocity on the Jewish quarter of Warsaw". Guardian sketch writer Simon Hoggart frequently lavished praise on Tapsell, describing him as "the grandest of grandees" (July 2008) and that when in the Chamber, Tapsell rises "to speak, or rather to intone superbly" (January 2008).

In June 2011, Tapsell was appointed as a Privy Counsellor in the 2011 Birthday Honours, and he was sworn into the Council the following month. Tapsell was reported as being one of the Conservative MPs to have spoken critically of Party Co-Chairman Sayeeda Warsi at a meeting of the 1922 Committee, following Warsi's handling of Roger Helmer MEP's defection to UKIP. In March 2014, he announced his intention to step down from Parliament at the 2015 general election, and also gave an interview where he was highly critical of former Prime Minister Margaret Thatcher, under whom he briefly served as a spokesman on economic policy when the Conservatives were still in Opposition in the 1970s.

Personal life
Tapsell married Cecilia Hawke, third daughter of the 9th Baron Hawke, in 1963. The couple had a son, James, who was born in 1966 and died in 1985. They divorced in 1971, and Tapsell subsequently married Gabrielle Mahieu in 1974. His former wife Cecilia married Tapsell's fellow Conservative politician Sir Nicholas Scott in 1979.

Tapsell died on 18 August 2018, aged 88.

References

External links 
Sir Peter Tapsell Conservative Party profile

News articles
Apologise for Henry VIII, MP says, BBC News, 30 November 2006

|-

|-

|-

|-

|-

1930 births
2018 deaths
Alumni of Merton College, Oxford
Conservative Party (UK) MPs for English constituencies
Knights Bachelor
Members of the Privy Council of the United Kingdom
People educated at Heath Mount School
People educated at Tonbridge School
People from Hove
Politicians awarded knighthoods
Royal Sussex Regiment officers
UK MPs 1959–1964
UK MPs 1966–1970
UK MPs 1970–1974
UK MPs 1974
UK MPs 1974–1979
UK MPs 1979–1983
UK MPs 1983–1987
UK MPs 1987–1992
UK MPs 1992–1997
UK MPs 1997–2001
UK MPs 2001–2005
UK MPs 2005–2010
UK MPs 2010–2015
British Eurosceptics